The Fruita Rural Historic District is a historic district in the Capitol Reef National Park in Wayne County, Utah, United States, that is listed on the National Register of Historic Places.

Description

The district comprises a former Mormon agricultural settlement that was active from 1895 to 1947. It includes what remains of the town of Fruita. The Leo R. Holt House, oldest in Fruita, was built in 1895 and the Fruita schoolhouse in 1896. Along with other scattered structures from the original settlement, the district also includes the 1940 ranger station, built for what was then Capitol Reef National Monument in the National Park Service Rustic style and constructed by the Civilian Conservation Corps. Later development included the Mission 66 park visitor center.

The orchards that gave Fruita its name are preserved as a "historic landscape" by the National Park Service.

See also

 National Register of Historic Places listings in Wayne County, Utah

References

External links

Buildings and structures in Wayne County, Utah
National Register of Historic Places in Capitol Reef National Park
Civilian Conservation Corps in Utah
Historic districts on the National Register of Historic Places in Utah
National Register of Historic Places in Wayne County, Utah